Qiaosi may refer to:

 Qiaosi Subdistrict, Hangzhou
 Qiaosi Station, Hangzhou Metro
 Qiaosi Railway Station
 Qiaosi Prison, Hangzhou